Max Normann Williamsen (born 24 July 2003) is a Norwegian football midfielder who currently plays for Kristiansund BK.

He played youth football for Clausenengen FK before joining Clausenengen's elite team Kristiansund BK. In September 2018 he signed with Kristiansund's first team on a 1.5-year deal. He made his Eliteserien debut in September 2020 against Viking.

Career statistics

Club 

 As of match played 12 December 2021

References

2003 births
Living people
Sportspeople from Kristiansund
Norwegian footballers
Kristiansund BK players
Levanger FK players
Eliteserien players
Association football midfielders
Norway youth international footballers